"Already Home" is the fourth single released by the Canadian Christian rock band Thousand Foot Krutch from their fifth Studio Album Welcome to the Masquerade. Carrie Underwood stated that she is a fan of the band and especially "Fire It Up" and "Already Home".

Chart performance 

The song charted at No. 35 on the Billboard Hot Christian Songs chart. In Canada, the song debuted at No. 99 on the Canadian Christian Songs chart.

Personnel 

 Trevor McNevan - vocals, guitar
 Joel Bruyere - bass
 Steve Augustine - drums

References

2010 singles
Thousand Foot Krutch songs
2009 songs
Tooth & Nail Records singles
Songs written by Trevor McNevan